The 2015–16 Biathlon World Cup – Pursuit Women started on Thursday December 3, 2015 in Östersund and finished on March 19, 2016, in Khanty-Mansiysk. The defending titlist Kaisa Mäkäräinen of Finland finished on the 4th place. Gabriela Soukalová of the Czech Republic won the title.

Competition format
The  pursuit race is skied over five laps. The biathlete shoots four times at any shooting lane, in the order of prone, prone, standing, standing, totalling 20 targets. For each missed target a biathlete has to run a penalty loop. Competitors' starts are staggered, according to the result of the previous sprint race.

2014–15 Top 3 Standings

Medal winners

Standings

References

Pursuit Women